Pretaapnarian Shawh Radhecheran Radhakishun (also known as Pretaap Radhakishun; 3 September 1934 – 6 January 2001) was a Surinamese politician. He was Prime Minister of Suriname from July 1986 to April 1987, and Vice President of Suriname from September 1996 to August 2000.

Early life
Radhakishun was born on 3 September 1934 in Paramaribo.  In September 1953, he moved to Leiden. Radhakishun earned a cand. in mathematics and physics in 1958, and a doctorandus in chemistry in 1962, both from Leiden University.

Prime Minister
Radhakishun was a businessman and vice-president of the Surinamese Business Association (VSB).  As a member of the VHP, he was chosen to succeed Wim Udenhout as Prime Minister of Suriname.  His power was limited by the influence of the National Military Council of Suriname.

Vice president
During the first term of the New Front government, Radhakishun became a critic of the coalition's power-sharing arrangements.  After the elections in 1996, Radhakishun joined a group of VHP members in breaking away from the party leadership and supporting NDP member Jules Wijdenbosch for president.  This group then joined the new government as the BVD.  Radhakishun served as Vice President from 15 September 1996 to 12 August 2000 in the cabinet of President Jules Wijdenbosch. Radhakishun and Wijdenbosch were defeated in the 2000 general elections by the New Front led by Ronald Venetiaan.  Venetiaan accused both Radhakishun and Wijdenbosch of mishandling government funds after the elections.

Radhakishun died on 6 September 2001 in Paramaribo after a prolonged illness.

References

1934 births
2001 deaths
Vice presidents of Suriname
People from Paramaribo
Progressive Reform Party (Suriname) politicians
National Democratic Party (Suriname) politicians
Prime Ministers of Suriname
Surinamese politicians of Indian descent
Surinamese Hindus
Leiden University alumni